The Western State Hospital, in Hopkinsville, Kentucky which started being built in 1848 and opened receiving its first patients in 1854 as the Western Kentucky Lunatic Asylum, is an inpatient center for the treatment of mental illness. It is on the National Register of Historic Places. It had a patient population as high as 2,200 by 1950. Improved medications for treatment of mental disorders allowed de-institutionalization and a decrease in inpatient numbers. The inpatient population as of 2004 was 220, from 34 counties in Western Kentucky. Its three facilities employed 650 workers in 2004.
Many stories of paranormal activity have been recorded and are to be related in the upcoming book Hauntings of the Western Lunatic Asylum by author Steve E. Asher.

References

External links
 History of Western State

Hospital buildings completed in 1854
National Register of Historic Places in Christian County, Kentucky
Psychiatric hospitals in Kentucky
1854 establishments in Kentucky
Hopkinsville, Kentucky
Hospital buildings on the National Register of Historic Places in Kentucky